Pancha Carrasco (8 April 1816 – 31 December 1890), born Francisca Carrasco Jiménez, was Costa Rica's first woman in the military. Carrasco is most famous for joining the defending forces at the Battle of Rivas in 1856 with a rifle and a pocketful of bullets. The strength and determination she showed there made her a symbol of national pride and she was later honored with a Costa Rican postage stamp, a Coast Guard vessel, and the creation of the "Pancha Carrasco Police Women's Excellence Award".

Biography
Francisca Carrasco Jiménez was born on 8 April 1816 in Cartago, Costa Rica, the daughter of Jose Francisco Carrasco and Maria Jiménez. She was of mixed American, African, and European heritage. Pancha was married two times, first in 1834 to Juan Solano, and later to Gil Zúñiga; however, neither of her marriages worked out.

In 1856 (age 40), when William Walker and his filibusteros invaded Costa Rica, Carrasco volunteered as an army cook and a medic. She is most famous for filling her apron pockets with bullets, grabbing a rifle, and joining the defending forces at the Battle of Rivas, becoming Costa Rica's first woman in the military

Legacy
Her strength and determination became a symbol of national pride, and she was commemorated with a Costa Rican postage stamp in 1984.It was issued on 10 April 1984 as the 1.50 Colon value in a four value set honoring national heroes. "Costa Rica", Scott Standard Postage Stamp Catalog, 1986, Vol 2, p. 687, column 4.

The Costa Rican Security Ministry established a "Pancha Carrasco Police Women's Excellence Award" in her honor. The former U.S. Coast Guard cutter Point Bridge was renamed Pancha Carrasco in her honor when it was turned over to the Costa Rican Coast Guard in 2001.

References
Sources consulted

 Boles, Janet K. and Hoeveler, Diane Long (2004) "Carrasco, Pancha (Francisca) 1826–1890" Historical Dictionary of Feminism (2nd ed.) Scarecrow Press, Lanham, Md., p. 70, 
 "Genealogía de Francisca Carrasco Jiménez, heroína de la Campaña Nacional contra los filibusteros" La Nacion: Raices No. 51  (Genealogy of Francisca Carrasco Jiménez, Heroine of the National Campaign against the Filibusteros) in Spanish
"Pancha Carrasco Jimenez", Salón de Beneméritos de la Patria y Ciudadanos de Honor.

Endnotes

1816 births
1890 deaths
People from Cartago Province
Women soldiers
Costa Rican women
Women in 19th-century warfare
Women in war in Central America
19th-century Costa Rican people